Icon Films is a British independent television production company that produces factual programmes for broadcast by networks both in the UK and US. The company was founded in 1990 by Harry Marshall and Laura Marshall, and is based in Bristol.

Current and Past Productions

Awards

Icon Films won the Grierson Award for Best Documentary Series.

References

External links
Icon Films website

Television production companies of the United Kingdom